Australluma is a genus of plant in family Apocynaceae.

Species accepted by the Plants of the World Online as of February 2023: 

 Australluma peschii (Nel) Plowes
 Australluma ubomboensis (I.Verd.) Bruyns

References 

 
Apocynaceae genera
Taxonomy articles created by Polbot